Phytala is a genus of butterflies in the family Lycaenidae endemic to the Afrotropical realm. The single species of this genus, Phytala elais, the giant forest blue, is found in Sierra Leone, Liberia, Ivory Coast, Ghana, Nigeria, Cameroon, Gabon, the Republic of the Congo, the Democratic Republic of the Congo, Sudan and Uganda. The habitat consists of forests.

Subspecies
Phytala elais elais (eastern Ivory Coast, Ghana, Nigeria: south and the Cross River loop, Cameroon, Gabon, Congo)
Phytala elais catori Bethune-Baker, 1903 (Sierra Leone, Liberia, western Ivory Coast)
Phytala elais ugandae Jackson, 1964 (Democratic Republic of the Congo, southern Sudan, Uganda)

References

Seitz, A. Die Gross-Schmetterlinge der Erde 13: Die Afrikanischen Tagfalter. Plate XIII 64

Poritiinae
Monotypic butterfly genera
Taxa named by John O. Westwood
Lycaenidae genera